Sen Ne Dilersen (International English title:Whatever You Wish) is a drama movie directed by Cem Başekioğlu. It was the director's debut full-length movie, as well as Işın Karaca's debut leading role, a Turkish pop singer. Famous actors like Fikret Kuşkan and Yıldız Kenter starred in the film. Leading lady "Eleni" who is portrayed by Işık Yenersu, a well-known actress in Turkey, has cancer in the film. Işık Yenersu has also suffered from cancer in real life during the production of the film.

The movie tells a thirty-year story of a Greek family who lives in Turkey.

Cast
Işık Yenersu (Eleni)
Fikret Kuşkan (Musa)
Işın Karaca (Marika)
Zeynep Eronat (Eftimiya)
Yıldız Kenter (Mimi)
Güler Ökten (Anastasia)
Ahmet Mümtaz Taylan (Zülfikar)
Haldun Boysan (Rıfkı)
Okan Yalabık (Stavro)
Ayçin İnci (Rosa's daughter)
Begüm Birgören (young Eleni)
Evrim Solmaz (young Eftimiya)
Ali Taygun (Apostos)
Hasan Yalnızoğlu (angel)
Asuman Krause (angel)

Other (uncredited):
Aytaç Arman
Anta Toros (Rosa)
Cem Özer
Leman Çıdamlı
Ebru Karanfilci (Sümbül)
Ayşin Zeren (angel)
Yakup Yavru (doctor)
Özden Özgürdal (verger)
Ayşe Merve

Awards

External links

2005 films
Turkish drama films
Films set in Turkey
2000s Turkish-language films